Clarence (Clarie) Gillis, MP (October 3, 1895 – December 17, 1960) was a Canadian social democratic politician and trade unionist from Cape Breton Island, Nova Scotia. He was born on Nova Scotia's mainland, but grew up in Cape Breton. He worked in the island's underground coal mines operated by the British Empire Steel and Coal Company (BESCO). He also served as a member of the infantry in the Canadian Corps in Flanders during the First World War. After the war he returned to the coal mines and became an official with the mine's United Mine Workers of America (UMW) union. In 1938, he helped bring UMW Local 26 into the Co-operative Commonwealth Federation (CCF), becoming the first labour local to affiliate with the party. In 1940, he became the first  CCF member elected to the House of Commons of Canada, east of Manitoba. While serving in the House, he was known as its leading voice championing labour issues. He was also a main voice for social rights during his 17-years in Parliament. His most notable achievement was securing the funding that allowed the building of a fixed-link between Nova Scotia's mainland and Cape Breton Island at the Strait of Canso: the Canso Causeway. After winning four straight elections, he was defeated in 1957 and died three years later in Glace Bay, Nova Scotia.

Early life and World War I service
He was born on the Nova Scotia mainland, in the town of Londonderry, in 1895.  His father, J.H. Gillis, moved the family to the Industrial Cape Breton area in 1904.  J.H. Gillis worked in the coal mines and was an associate of union leader J. B. McLachlan.  Clarie, as Clarence Gillis was known, started working in the region's coal mines in 1913.  The next year, he joined the Canadian Corps and rose from private to acting lieutenant.   He suffered a head wound from shrapnel in Flanders.  He would recover enough to go back to the mines after the war.

Trade Unionist and Federal MP
The period between 1920–1940 was the time that Gillis rose through the ranks of the United Mine Workers of America (UMW) Local 26. He represented the federal riding of Cape Breton South, which included the city of Sydney, the towns of Glace Bay, New Waterford, Dominion and surrounding areas from 1940 until his defeat in the 1957 election.

Gillis was known as a defender of the working-man, and is credited with popularizing the Mouseland political parable. In 1943, The Ottawa Citizen had an editorial that attacked Cape Breton miners for asking for more butter during wartime rationing. As Gillis pointed out in the House of Commons, Cape Breton miners had amongst the highest enlistment rates in Canada, and their families were needy, not just for butter, but just about every kind of basic food-stuff. His constant support for workers did eventually bring about changes in the latter part of World War II.

When labour unions were being attacked in Parliament, Gillis was usually the one called upon to defend them. In 1942, during the speech from the throne debate, H. A. Bruce, the Conservative Party member from Toronto's Parkdale electoral district, was a typical critic of the Canadian Congress of Labor (CCL). Parliamentarians started attacking the American Congress of Industrial Organizations (CIO), which the CCL was affiliated with, and claiming that its union members were hurting the war-effort. Gillis stood up in Parliament and actively defended the unions, reminding the Commons, that he had been a unionist for over 25-years. Scenes like this were common for Gillis during this period.

He was one of the few MPs that attacked the Canadian government's racist policies towards Japanese Canadians in the period between 1942–45.  In the House of Commons of Canada, he stated the following:

While we know that the war with Japan is a serious matter and that many atrocities have been committed by the people of that country, there is no reason why we should try to duplicate the performances of that country.

His defence of Japanese-Canadians arose out of the July 1944 debate on whether to allow them to vote. After questioning from prime minister William Lyon Mackenzie King, Gillis pointed out that the CCF's official position is that all Canadians, especially those born in Canada, should have the full rights of that citizenship and have the franchise to vote. In the end, Liberal government ignored the CCF's pleas, and passed a law to racially restrict voting for Japanese-Canadians.

One of his most notable achievements while in Parliament, was getting federal government funding to build the Canso Causeway to bridge mainland-Nova Scotia to Cape Breton Island. The causeway was opened on August 13, 1955, and Gillis was part of the opening ceremonies, though his part was downplayed in the media at the time, as recently deceased former Nova Scotia premier Angus L. MacDonald was given most of the credit.

Personal life and death
He failed to get re-elected in the general election of 1957. He ran for parliament for the last time in 1958, the year of the Diefenbaker-Sweep, and lost the election. He retired from politics after this defeat.  His first wife, Maime Gillis, née Stewart, died in 1953.  He married his second wife, Theresa Sargeant in 1958.
He died of pleurisy, in the Glace Bay Hospital, on December 17, 1960, in Cape Breton.

Election results

References

Notes

Citations

Bibliography

External links
 

Members of the House of Commons of Canada from Nova Scotia
Co-operative Commonwealth Federation MPs
20th-century Canadian politicians
Canadian socialists
1895 births
1960 deaths
Canadian military personnel of World War I